The right to keep and bear arms (often referred to as the right to bear arms) is a right for people to possess weapons (arms) for the preservation of life, liberty, and property. The purpose of gun rights is for self-defense, including security against tyranny, as well as hunting and sporting activities. Countries that guarantee the right to keep and bear arms include the Czech Republic, Guatemala, Ukraine, Mexico, the Philippines, the United States, and Yemen.

Background

The Bill of Rights 1689 allowed Protestant citizens of England to "have Arms for their Defence suitable to their Conditions and as allowed by Law" and restricted the ability of the English Crown to have a standing army or to interfere with Protestants' right to bear arms "when Papists were both Armed and Imployed contrary to Law" and established that Parliament, not the Crown, could regulate the right to bear arms.

Sir William Blackstone wrote in the 18th century that the right to have arms was auxiliary to the "natural right of resistance and self-preservation" subject to suitability and allowance by law. The term arms, as used in the 1600s, refers to the process of equipping for war. It is commonly used as a synonym for weapon.

Inclusion of this right in a written constitution is uncommon. In 1875, 17 percent of national constitutions included a right to bear arms. Since the early twentieth century, "the proportion has been less than 9 percent and falling". In an article titled "U.S. Gun Rights Truly Are American Exceptionalism," a historical survey and comparative analysis of constitutions dating back to 1789, Tom Ginsburg and colleagues "identified only 15 constitutions (in nine countries) that had ever included an explicit right to bear arms. Almost all of these constitutions have been in Latin America, and most were from the 19th century".

Countries recognizing the right to keep and bear arms

Americas

Guatemala

 

While protecting the right to keep arms, Guatemalan constitution specifies that this right extends only to "weapons not prohibited by law".

Honduras
 The constitution of Honduras does not protect the right to keep and bear arms.

Although not explicitly mentioned in the legislation, every person is entitled to receive a license to keep and carry arms by Honduran Statute law, provided that they fulfill the conditions required by the law.

Mexico
 

The Mexican constitution of 1857 first included the right to be armed. In its first version, the right was defined in similar terms as it is in the Second Amendment to the United States Constitution. A new Mexican constitution of 1917 relativized the right, stating that its utilization must be in line with local police regulations.

Another change was included in 1917 Constitution. Since then, Mexicans have the right to be armed only within their home and further utilization of this right is subject to statutory authorization in Federal law.

United States
 

In the United States, which has an English common law tradition, a longstanding common-law right to keep and bear arms was practiced prior to the creation of a written national constitution. Today, this right is specifically protected by the United States Constitution and many state constitutions.

Europe

Czech Republic

  

Historically, the Czech lands were at the forefront of the spreading of civilian firearms ownership. In the 1420s and 1430s, firearms became indispensable tools for the mostly peasant Hussite armies whose amateur combatants, including women, fended off a series of invasions of professional crusader armies of well-armored warriors with cold weapons. Throughout and after the Hussite wars, firearms' design underwent fast development and their possession by civilians became a matter of course.

Their first firearms regulation was enacted in 1517 as a part of general accord between the nobles and burghers and later in 1524 as a standalone Enactment on Firearms (zřízení o ručnicích). The 1517 law explicitly stated that "all people of all standing have the right to keep firearms at home" while at the same time enacting a universal carry ban. The 1524 enactment set out a process of issuing of permits for carrying of firearms and detailed enforcement and punishment for carrying without such a permit. Carrying later became permitless again until 1852, when Imperial Regulation No. 223 reintroduced carry permits. This law remained in force until the 1939 German invasion.

Since its inception during the Hussite revolution, the right to keep firearms endured over five-hundred years until the Nazi gun ban during the German occupation in the 20th century. Firearms possession later became subject to government permission during the communist dictatorship with only those deemed loyal to the communist party being able to be armed. After the return of liberty, the Czech Republic instated a shall issue permitting process, under which all residents can keep and bear arms subject to the fulfillment of regulatory conditions.

In the Czech Republic, every resident that meets conditions laid down in Act No. 119/2002 Coll. has the right to have a firearms license issued and can then obtain a firearm. Holders of D (exercise of profession) and E (self-defense) licenses, which are also shall-issue, can carry up to two concealed firearms for protection. The right to be armed is statutorily protected.

A proposal to have right to keep and bear arms included in the constitution was entered in the Czech Parliament in December 2016. The proposal was approved by vote of 139 to 9 on 28 June 2017 by the Chamber of Deputies. It later failed to reach necessary support in Senate, where only 28 out of 59 Senators present supported it (with constitutional majority being 36 votes). A new proposal was entered by 35 Senators in September 2019 and then approved on 21 July 2021, adding a new sentence, according to which "the right to defend one's own life or the life of another person even with the use of a weapon is guaranteed under the conditions set by the law."

Switzerland

The Swiss have a statutory right to bear arms under Article 3 of the 1997 Weapons Act.
Switzerland practices universal conscription, which requires that all able-bodied male citizens keep fully automatic firearms at home in case of a call-up. Each male between the ages of 20 and 34 is considered a candidate for conscription into the military, and following a brief period of active duty will commonly be enrolled in the militia until age or an inability to serve ends his obligation. Until December 2009, these men were required to keep their government-issued selective fire combat rifles and semi-automatic handguns in their homes as long as they were enrolled in the armed forces. Since January 2010, they have had the option of depositing their personal firearm at a government arsenal. Until September 2007, soldiers received 50 rounds of government-issued ammunition in a sealed box for storage at home; after 2007 only about 2,000 specialist troops are allowed to keep the ammunition at home.

In a referendum in February 2011, voters rejected a citizens' initiative that would have obliged members of the armed services to store their rifles and pistols on military compounds and required that privately owned firearms be registered.

United Kingdom

In the United Kingdom, there is no automatic right to bear arms, although citizens may possess certain firearms on obtaining an appropriate licence.  Ordinary members of the public may own sporting rifles and shotguns, subject to licensing, while handguns, automatic, and centerfire semi-automatic weapons are illegal to possess without special additional conditions.
When not attended, all licensed firearms must be stored securely (locked) and separate from their ammunition. Regulations for airguns are less stringent and air pistols with a muzzle energy not exceeding 6 foot-pounds force (8.1 joules) and other airguns with a muzzle energy not exceeding 12 ft⋅lbf (16 J) do not require any certificates or licensing, although the same storage requirement applies.
The first serious control on firearms was established with the passing of the Firearms Act 1920, handgun restrictions being added in response to the 1996 Dunblane Massacre in which 18 people died.

Historically the English Bill of Rights 1689 allowed:

Since 1953, it has been a criminal offence in the United Kingdom to carry a knife (with the exception of non-locking folding knives with a cutting edge of 3 inches (7.62 centimetres) or less) or any "offensive weapon" in a public place without lawful authority (e.g. police or security forces) or reasonable excuse (e.g. tools that are needed for work). The cutting edge of a knife is separate to the blade length. The only manner in which an individual may carry arms is on private property or any property to which the public does not have a lawful right of access, as the law only creates the offence when it occurs in public, e.g., a person's own home, private land, the area in a shop where the public have no access, etc. Furthermore, Criminal Justice Act 1988 Section 141 specifically lists all offensive weapons that cannot technically be owned, even on private property, by way of making it illegal to sell, trade, hire, etc. an offensive weapon to another person.

Furthermore, the law does not allow an offensive weapon or ordinary item intended or adapted as an offensive weapon to be carried in public before the threat of violence arises. This would only be acceptable in the eyes of the law if the person armed themselves immediately preceding or during an attack (in a public place). This is known as a "weapon of opportunity" or "instantaneous arming".

Other

Sharia law
Under Sharia law, there is an intrinsic freedom to own arms. However, in times of civil strife or internal violence, this right can be temporarily suspended to keep peace and prevent harm, as mentioned by Imam ash-Shatibi in his works on Maqasid ash-Shari'ah (The Intents and Purposes of Shari'ah). Citizens not practicing Islam are prohibited from bearing arms and are required to be protected by the military, the state for which they pay the jizyah. In exchange they do not need to pay the zakat.

Yemen
 
Yemen recognizes statutory right to keep and bear arms. Firearms are both easily and legally accessible.

Gun violence and the politics of the right to bear arms 

Legal restrictions on the right to keep and bear arms are usually put in place by legislators in an attempt to reduce firearm-based violence and crime. Their actions may be the result of political groups advocating for such regulations. The Brady Campaign, Snowdrop Campaign, and the Million Mom March are examples of campaigns calling for tighter restrictions on the right to keep and bear arms. Accident statistics can be hard to obtain, but much data is available on the issue of gun ownership and gun related deaths.

United Nations Interregional Crime and Justice Research Institute 

The United Nations Interregional Crime and Justice Research Institute (UNICRI) has made comparisons between countries with different levels of gun ownership and investigated the correlation between gun ownership levels and gun homicides, and between gun ownership levels and gun suicides. A "substantial correlation" is seen in both.

UNICRI also investigated the relationship between gun ownership levels and other forms of homicide or suicide to determine whether high levels of gun ownership added to or merely displaced other forms of homicide or suicide. They reported that "widespread gun ownership has not been found to reduce the likelihood of fatal events committed with other means. Thus, people do not turn to knives and other potentially lethal instruments less often when more guns are available, but more guns usually means more victims of suicide and homicide." The researchers concluded that "all we know is that guns do not reduce fatal events due to other means, but that they go along with more shootings. Although we do not know why exactly this is so, we have a good reason to suspect guns to play a fatal role in this".

This research found that guns were the major cause of homicides in three of the fourteen countries it studied: Northern Ireland, Italy, and the United States. Although some data indicates that reducing the availability of one significant type of arms—firearms—leads to reductions both in gun crimes and gun suicides and moderate reductions in overall crimes and overall suicides, the author did caution that "reducing the number of guns in the hands of the private citizen may become a hopeless task beyond a certain point," citing the American example where gun laws remain a subject of heated debate (see also Gun politics in the United States).

A posterior study by UNICRI researchers from 2001 examined the link between household gun ownership and overall homicide, overall suicide, as well as gun homicide and gun suicide rates amongst 21 countries. The researchers declared "The results show very strong correlations between the presence of guns in the home and suicide committed with a gun, rates of gun-related homicide involving female victims, and gun-related assault." There were no significant correlations detected for total homicide and suicide rates, as well as gun homicide rates involving male victims.

Other 

Some other research indicates that gun levels do not affect the total number of homicides or the total number of suicides, but rather affect the share of homicides or suicides committed with guns.

Public-health critic, gun-rights proponent, and editor-in-chief of Surgical Neurology International Miguel Faria contended in 2012 that keeping and bearing arms not only has constitutional protection, but also that firearms have beneficial aspects that have been ignored by the public health establishment in which he played a part. He also contended that guns are beneficial in self-defense, collective defense, and in protecting life and property.

A 2012 study in the journal Annual Review of Public Health found that suicide rates are greater in households with firearms than those without them.

See also

 Index of gun politics articles
 List of countries by gun ownership
 Overview of gun laws by nation
 Right of self-defense
 Knife legislation

Notes

References

Further reading
 
 
 
 
 
 
 
 
 

American phraseology
Civil rights and liberties
Gun politics
Human rights by issue